Quickness, also known as With the Quickness, is the fourth full-length studio album by hardcore punk pioneers Bad Brains. At the time of its release, it was the best selling Bad Brains album and also featured an MTV video for the lead-off track "Soul Craft" directed by Paul Rachman who later went on to produce and direct the feature documentary American Hardcore. Drummer Earl Hudson, though pictured on the cover, does not play on the record, as drum parts were instead performed by Mackie Jayson of the Cro-Mags. In an interview with MTV, guitarist Dr. Know said that the album's title comes from urgency and swiftness.

The album was a crossover release that contained elements of several genres, including funk, hip hop, heavy metal, punk, and reggae, which made a notable return after being absent from 1986's I Against I. It is also the band's most controversial release, containing lyrics that some claim were homophobic.

Critical reception
Dave E. Henderson of Music Week considered that with this album the band "should finally achieve greater notoriety". But on the other hand it is losing its identity while presenting "frenetic punk-metal with all the growling cliches from years gone by" instead of previous mix of reggae and punk.

Controversy
The song "Don't Blow Bubbles" had lyrics that were criticized as being homophobic and suggesting that AIDS was God's punishment for homosexuality. When asked about the song, guitarist Dr. Know said that "We wrote that song as kind of an angry warning to homosexuals. We didn't really mean to insult them, but a lot of people we knew seemed to be living with their eyes closed." In a 2007 interview where bassist Darryl Jenifer called their previous views "ignorant", he was asked about the song and the furor over the lyrics and replied "They don't understand that we've grown. Just like anyone, I'm not ashamed to say, 'Maybe I could have been…' Damn right, I was a homophobe! I shouldn't have to explain that to the world because everyone will do that. That's wisdom. You have to grow to be wise." On the 2022 reissue of the album, an instrumental version of "Don't Blow Bubbles" was included in place of the original version, with the song's title changed to "Instrumental".

Track listing
"Soul Craft" (Miller, Jenifer, Hudson)
"Voyage Into Infinity" (Miller, Jenifer, Hudson)
"The Messengers" (Miller, Hudson, Hahn)
"With the Quickness" (Miller, Jenifer, Hudson)
"Gene Machine/Don't Bother Me" (Miller, Jenifer, Hudson)
"Don't Blow Bubbles" (Miller, Jenifer, Hudson)
"Sheba" (Miller, Hudson)
"Yout' Juice" (Miller, Jenifer, Hudson)
"No Conditions" (Miller, Jenifer, Hudson)
"Silent Tears" (Jenifer, Hudson)
"The Prophet's Eye" (Miller, Jenifer, Hudson)
"Endtro" (Miller, Jenifer)

Personnel
Bad Brains
H.R. – vocals
Dr. Know – guitar
Darryl Jenifer – bass
Earl Hudson – drums (credited, but does not appear on album)

Additional musicians
Mackie Jayson – session drummer

References

Bad Brains albums
1989 albums
Caroline Records albums
Albums produced by Ron Saint Germain